Circe Sturm is a professor in the Department of Anthropology, University of Texas, Austin. She is also an actress, appearing mainly in films and commercials.

Background 
Circe Dawn Sturm was born in Houston, Texas. She identifies her father as being of Mississippi Choctaw descent and her mother as being Italian American.

Career 
Sturm has written two books on Cherokee identity. Blood Politics (2002) presents results of her ethnographic fieldwork in the Cherokee Nation from 1995 to 1998. Becoming Indian (2011) discusses the concept of race shifting: how a rapidly growing number of people in the United States are self-identifying as Native American – usually, as Cherokee – without any documentation to support their claims. Race shifting is not just confined to the United States, but has also been observed in Canada. Sturm has been interviewed on issues relating to Cherokee identity, such as the Cherokee Freedmen controversy and Elizabeth Warren's claims to Cherokee ancestry.

Before joining UT Austin, Sturm taught at the University of Oklahoma.

Selected publications 
Blood Politics: Race, Culture and Identity in the Cherokee Nation of Oklahoma
Becoming Indian: The Struggle over Cherokee Identity in the Twenty-First Century
"Reflections on the anthropology of sovereignty and settler colonialism: lessons from Native North America."

See also 
 Native American identity in the United States
 Blood quantum laws
Detribalization

References 

Living people
American actresses
American people of Choctaw descent
American women academics
University of California, Davis alumni
University of Texas at Austin faculty
Year of birth missing (living people)
21st-century American women writers